Jessica Sachse is a paralympic athlete from Germany competing mainly in category F46 sprints and javelin events.

Sachse competed in five Paralympics, winning medals in four of them.  Her first games were in Seoul in 1988 where she won silvers in the 100m and 200m and bronzes in the 400m and javelin.  By 1992 in Barcelona she was concentrating on the 100m and 200m and managed to convert her two silvers into 2 golds.  1996 Summer Paralympics in Atlanta saw Sachse return to the javelin as well as the 100m and 200m but she was only able to win a solitary silver in the 100m. Competing in the same events in 2000 resulted in just the javelin bronze medal.  The 2004 Summer Paralympics were her last games and the only time she did not win a medal after competing in the 100m and javelin.

References

Paralympic athletes of Germany
Athletes (track and field) at the 1988 Summer Paralympics
Athletes (track and field) at the 1992 Summer Paralympics
Athletes (track and field) at the 1996 Summer Paralympics
Athletes (track and field) at the 2004 Summer Paralympics
Paralympic gold medalists for Germany
Paralympic silver medalists for Germany
Paralympic bronze medalists for Germany
Living people
Medalists at the 1988 Summer Paralympics
Medalists at the 1992 Summer Paralympics
Medalists at the 1996 Summer Paralympics
Medalists at the 2000 Summer Paralympics
Year of birth missing (living people)
Paralympic medalists in athletics (track and field)
German female sprinters
German female javelin throwers
Sprinters with limb difference
Javelin throwers with limb difference
Paralympic sprinters
Paralympic javelin throwers